James Spencer Cleverly  (born 4 September 1969) is a British politician and Army Reserve officer who has served as Secretary of State for Foreign, Commonwealth and Development Affairs since 2022. A member of the Conservative Party, he has been the member of Parliament (MP) for Braintree in Essex since 2015. He previously served as Secretary of State for Education from July to September 2022, Co-Chairman of the Conservative Party alongside Ben Elliot from 2019 to 2020 and as the member of the London Assembly (AM) for Bexley and Bromley from 2008 to 2016.

Cleverly advocated a vote for Brexit in the 2016 EU membership referendum. In the second May ministry, he served as Deputy Chairman of the Conservative Party from 2018 to 2019 and Parliamentary Under-Secretary of State for Exiting the European Union from April to July 2019. After Boris Johnson was appointed Prime Minister in July 2019, Cleverly was promoted to the Cabinet as Minister without portfolio. He served as co-chairman of the Conservative Party alongside Ben Elliot from 2019 to 2020. Cleverly was demoted from the Cabinet in the 2020 cabinet reshuffle and appointed Minister of State for Middle East and North Africa. He became Minister of State for Middle East, North Africa and North America in December 2021, before being appointed Minister of State for Europe and North America in February 2022. In July 2022 he succeeded Michelle Donelan as Secretary of State for Education. In September 2022 he was appointed Foreign Secretary by then-Prime Minister Liz Truss, making him the first Foreign Secretary of African heritage in British history.

Early life and education
Cleverly was born on 4 September 1969 in Lewisham, London, to James Philip and Evelyn Suna Cleverly. His father is British and worked as a surveyor and his mother worked as a midwife and is from Sierra Leone. He was privately educated at Riverston School and Colfe's School, both in Lee, London. Cleverly then trained in the army, but his training was cut short by a leg injury in 1989. He went on to gain a Bachelor of Arts degree in hospitality management studies from Ealing College of Higher Education (now University of West London) in 1991.

After graduating, he worked for the publishing company Verenigde Nederlandse Uitgeverijen; he joined Informa as international sales manager in 2002. Two years later, Cleverly joined Crimson Publishing as an advertising manager. He  became online commercial manager for Caspian Publishing in 2006. The following year, he co-founded web publishing company Point and Fire.

Military service
On 6 October 1991, Cleverly was commissioned into the Territorial Army, as a second lieutenant (on probation). In January 1993, his commission was confirmed and he was made a substantive second lieutenant. He was promoted to lieutenant on 6 October 1993, to captain on 26 May 1998, and to major on 1 November 2003. Until 2005, he was Battery Commander of 266 (Para) Battery Royal Artillery (Volunteers).

Cleverly was promoted to lieutenant colonel on 1 March 2015.

Cleverly is currently part of Central Volunteers HQ Royal Artillery (now known as National Reserve Headquarters, Royal Artillery), working as a Staff Officer in 1st (UK) Armoured Division.

Political career

London Assembly
In March 2007, Cleverly was selected as the candidate for the Bexley and Bromley constituency of the London Assembly in a very tightly fought selection contest. The London Assembly election was held on 1 May with the count and declaration on 2 May, where he received 105,162 votes (52.6% of the vote) and a majority of 75,237.

In January 2009, Cleverly was appointed as the mayor of London's youth ambassador, a newly created role which was seen as being a replacement post for the deputy mayor for young people, a post left vacant after the resignation of Ray Lewis. The creation of the role caused some controversy as it was not filled by a mayoral appointment but by a member of the Assembly whose formal role was to scrutinise the Mayor. The decision was defended because of the precedent set by the appointment of Kit Malthouse as Deputy Mayor for Policing.

In February 2010, Cleverly was appointed as the chairman of the London Waste and Recycling Board, replacing Boris Johnson who had stood down.

In August 2010 Cleverly posted a tweet in which he called Liberal Democrat deputy leader Simon Hughes "a dick", in response to a suggestion by Hughes that backbench MPs should be able to veto Coalition policies. The full tweet stated: "We may be coalition partners but it doesn't stop me thinking Simon Hughes is a dick." He later apologised.

In November 2010, Cleverly was re-selected to be the Conservative candidate for Bexley and Bromley at the 2012 London Assembly election, going on to win the seat with 88,482 votes (once again 52.6% of the votes) and a majority of 47,768. After the defeat of Brian Coleman at the election, Cleverly was appointed to the chair of the London Fire and Emergency Planning Authority.

House of Commons
In January 2015, Cleverly was selected to be the Conservative Parliamentary candidate for Braintree for the 2015 general election, after the sitting Conservative MP Brooks Newmark stood down following controversy over sexting and the sending of obscene images online. His selection came after the initial selection process was quietly suspended by Conservative Campaign Headquarters, after the local party chose someone not on the approved candidates list and was told to "think again". He was subsequently elected as the constituency's MP, following which he did not defend his seat at the 2016 London Assembly election.

In November 2015 Cleverly was criticised for pushing through the closure of 10 fire stations in London after the death of an elderly man in Camden following delays in the arrival of fire crews. In response, Cleverly said: "It is impossible for them to say that with certainty. I think it would be much wiser for the FBU to wait for the details of that fire investigation to come out before they start making these opportunistic allegations."

In January 2016, the Labour Party proposed an amendment to the Housing and Planning Bill 2016 that would have required private landlords to make homes which they put up for rent "fit for human habitation". According to Parliament's register of interests, Cleverly was one of 72 Conservative MPs who voted against the amendment and who personally derived an income from renting out property. The Conservative Government had responded to the amendment by saying that they believed homes should be fit for human habitation but did not want to pass the new law that would explicitly require it.

In March 2016 Cleverly was asked to step down as patron of Advocacy for All, a charity supporting disadvantaged people in South East England. The charity felt he was no longer a suitable person for the role, given that he had voted to cut Employment and Support Allowance (the benefit paid to disabled people who are unable to work).

Cleverly advocated a vote for Brexit in the 2016 EU membership referendum.

Cleverly was re-elected, with an increased majority (62.8% of the votes cast), at the 2017 general election. In January 2018 he was appointed as a deputy chairman of the Conservative Party before moving to become a junior minister at the Department for Exiting the European Union in April 2019.

In October 2018 Cleverly defended Conservative London mayoral candidate Shaun Bailey over potentially Islamophobic and Hinduphobic comments he had made in a pamphlet and suggested that black boys were drifting into crime as a result of learning more about faiths other than "their own Christian culture".

On 29 May 2019, Cleverly announced he was standing to replace Theresa May in the 2019 Conservative Party leadership election, but announced his withdrawal from the race on 4 June 2019.

Following the appointment of Boris Johnson as Prime Minister, Cleverly was appointed Co-Chairman of the Conservative Party, serving alongside Ben Elliot.

In the 2020 cabinet reshuffle, Cleverly was appointed Minister of State for the Middle East and North Africa.

On 7 July 2022, Cleverly succeeded Michelle Donelan as Secretary of State for Education, a post that he held for almost two months.

Foreign Secretary

Cleverly was appointed Foreign Secretary by incoming Prime Minister Liz Truss on 6 September 2022.

Cleverly attended the UN Security Council meeting on 22 September, where he called on other countries to reject the referendums due to take place in Russian occupied areas in eastern and southern Ukraine.

On 20 October, he announced that the United Kingdom would pursue sanctions against Iran for supplying drones to attack civilian targets in Ukraine. Cleverly stated that "Iran cannot be allowed to violate UN resolutions".

Cleverly endorsed Boris Johnson in the October 2022 Conservative Party Leadership Election but Johnson did not end up standing and Cleverly instead endorsed Rishi Sunak. Sunak re-appointed him to this position as part of his cabinet on 25 October 2022.

In October 2022, due to doubts raised that British homosexual football fans would be safe at the 2022 Football World Cup taking place in Qatar, Cleverly suggested that gay fans should show "a little bit of flex and compromise". He added that he thought it was "important when you're a visitor to a country that you respect the culture of your host nation." He described Qatar as "an Islamic country with a very different set of cultural norms to our own [those of Britain]". While Labour called his advice "shockingly tone-deaf". Due to the fact that gay activity is illegal in Qatar and that Cleverly had known that if gay people expressed their homosexuality openly in Qatar they would be arrested, it was suggested that Cleverly was trying to protect LGBT people without directly speaking against the practices of the Qatari Government. Earlier in 2022, LGBT organisations stated that "progress has been slow" in attempting to ensure the safety of LGBT football fans with FIFA in Qatar – and additionally that reassurances from Qatar had "not been adequate". In Qatar sex between men carries a penalty of up to 7 years in prison.

In May 2022, the country's emir, Tamim bin Hamad al-Thani, said that he believed criticism about Qatar being chosen to host the World Cup came from "people who cannot accept the idea that an Arab Muslim country would host a tournament like the World Cup." Rishi Sunak's spokesperson distanced itself from Cleverly's comments, saying that fans should not have to "compromise who they are", and that "Qatar's policies are not those of the UK government and not ones we would endorse."

Later, in late November 2022, Cleverly stated that his actions were "about ensuring that the English and Welsh fans going over to enjoy the football were safe and happy and that they enjoyed themselves whilst watching the tournament."

In early December 2022, he met his Norwegian counterpart, Anniken Huitfeldt, to discuss continued military cooperation and attended the annual Christmas tree lighting.

Cleverly met again with Antony Blinken, the U.S. Secretary of State, in Washington D.C. to discuss the Russian invasion of Ukraine, recent events in Iran following the anti-regime protest occurring there among other issues, and to reaffirm the UK's special relationship with the United States.

Personal life
Cleverly married Susannah Sparks in 2000; the couple have two sons. Cleverly lives in Blackheath.

Cleverly was accused of causing damage to a fellow motorist's car while driving on the M11 motorway. The incident occurred in August 2019, with the other driver claiming that Cleverly had been speeding while using his phone.

His cousin Chris Cleverly is a lawyer and businessman.

Cleverly is a fan of the miniature wargame Warhammer 40,000, and has a private YouTube channel dedicated to painting the game's miniatures.

Cleverly is an atheist.

Honours and decorations
Cleverly was awarded the Efficiency Decoration (TD) for 12 years' commissioned service in the Territorial Army in January 2012, as well as the Queen Elizabeth II Golden Jubilee Medal in 2002, the Queen Elizabeth II Diamond Jubilee Medal in 2012, and the Queen Elizabeth II Platinum Jubilee Medal in 2022.

He was sworn of the Privy Council of the United Kingdom in 2019 as part of his appointment as Minister without portfolio and Conservative Party Chairman in the Johnson ministry. This entitled him to the honorific title "The Right Honourable".

Notes

References

External links

 
 James Cleverly's blog
 
 

|-

1969 births
Living people
21st-century English businesspeople
Alumni of the University of West London
Black British MPs
Black British politicians
British Secretaries of State for Foreign and Commonwealth Affairs
British Secretaries of State for Education
Chairmen of the Conservative Party (UK)
Conservative Members of the London Assembly
Conservative Party (UK) MPs for English constituencies
English people of Sierra Leonean descent
Members of the Privy Council of the United Kingdom
People educated at Colfe's School
People from Lewisham
Royal Artillery officers
UK MPs 2015–2017
UK MPs 2017–2019
UK MPs 2019–present
British Eurosceptics